Waukenabo is an unincorporated community in Waukenabo Township, Aitkin County, Minnesota, United States; located near Palisade.

The community is located between Aitkin and Hill City at the junction of U.S. Highway 169 and 500th Lane.

Aitkin County Road 3 (Grove Street / 480th Street) is nearby.

Waukenabo is located within ZIP code 56469, based in Palisade.  A post office previously operated in Waukenabo from 1902 to 1916.

References

 Official State of Minnesota Highway Map – 2011/2012 edition

Unincorporated communities in Minnesota
Unincorporated communities in Aitkin County, Minnesota